Zacthys is a genus of moths of the family Noctuidae.

Species
Zacthys biplaga Viette, 1973

References
Natural History Museum Lepidoptera genus database

Hadeninae